Kenneth Dawayne Poole (born October 20, 1958) is a former American football defensive end for the Miami Dolphins of the National Football League (NFL). He was drafted by the Dolphins in the fifth round (126th overall) of the 1981 NFL Draft. He played college football at Louisiana-Monroe.

See also
 List of Louisiana–Monroe Warhawks in the NFL Draft

1958 births
Living people
American football defensive ends
Louisiana–Monroe Warhawks football players
Miami Dolphins players